Mansfield Bridge may refer to:

The Mansfield Covered Bridge in Parke County, Indiana

The W.D. Mansfield Memorial Bridge in Allegheny County, Pennsylvania, which connects the borough of Dravosburg and the city of McKeesport.